"Demons" is the fourth and final single from Super Furry Animals' album Radiator. It reached #27 on the UK Singles Chart on its release in November 1997.

Release and critical reception

"Demons" was released on CD, cassette and 7" on 24 November 1997 and reached number 27 on the UK Singles Chart. The cover art is the last in a series of five Pete Fowler paintings commissioned by the band for Radiator and its singles. Fowler's art was inspired by "Demons" and depicts "the unholy tribes of the undead" according to Record Collector. The packaging of the single features the Welsh language quote "Esmwyth! Esmwyth! Dim blewyn o'i le!", which roughly translates into English as "Smooth! Smooth! Not a hair out of place!". It is the last single by the group to contain such a quote, bringing to an end a practise that started with their debut single "Hometown Unicorn". The track was included on the band's 'greatest hits' compilation album Songbook: The Singles, Vol. 1, issued in 2004.

Music video
The video was filmed in Colombia.  It shows humanist scenes of everyday life, with the band observing and sometimes casually interacting with the locals.

Cover versions
Shy Nobleman performed a cover of the song translated to Hebrew as "Shedim"  ( שדים )as part of his 2013 album My Day is a Dream. Manfred Mann's Earth Band combined the song with Prefab Sprout's song "Dragons" to produce a new song titled "Demons and Dragons".

Accolades

* denotes an unordered list

Track listing

All songs by Super Furry Animals.

CD (CRESCD283)

"Demons" – 5:13
"Hit and Run" – 3:31
"Carry the Can" – 4:47

MC (CRES283), 7" poster pack (CRE283)

"Demons" – 5:13
"Hit and Run" – 3:31

Personnel
Gruff Rhys – vocals, acoustic guitar
Huw Bunford – guitar
Guto Pryce – bass guitar
Cian Ciaran – keyboards
Dafydd Ieuan – drums
Les Morrison - Banjo
Gorwel Owen - E-bow, samples
Martin Smith - trumpet

Singles chart positions

References

Super Furry Animals songs
Creation Records singles
1997 singles
1997 songs